The Animals is a 2012 Filipino coming-of-age film directed by Gino M. Santos.  It is about the daily struggles of three teens living in upper middle class Manila. The film is one of the official entries at the 8th Cinemalaya Film Festival in 2012 and won Best Editing. The film continued to receive wide recognition, such as being nominated for Best Screenplay, Best Cinematography, and Best Musical Score at the 36th Gawad Urian Award, as well as international premieres in the Stockholm International Film Festival and the New York Asian Film Festival.

Synopsis 
Set in an affluent, upper middle class village in the suburbs, The Animals chronicles a day in the life of Jake (Albie Casiño), Trina (Dawn Jimenez), and Alex (Patrick Sugui), who go through the musings that every kid in high school has to deal with. All Jake wants to do is have a good time, Alex just wants to fit in, and Trina simply wants more. A vivid picture is painted of life in high school after the final bell rings, as well as a different side of the Philippines, and what is happening to its privileged children.

Cast 
 Albie Casiño as Jake
 Dawn Jimenez as Trina
 Patrick Sugui as Alex/Bogli
 John Wayne Sace as Marco/Kukurikapoo
 Carlo Cruz as Master David
 Andrew Felix as Head Master
 Micah Cabral as Leslie
 Vangie Martell as Cara
 Issa Litton as Trina and Alex's Mom
 Brian Homecillo as Pierre

Reception 
Oggs Cruz of Twitch Film wrote, "With the film, Santos reveals himself to be a filmmaker with a lot of both promise and room to improve on."  Richard Kuipers of Variety wrote that the film "is technically rough but has plenty to say about peer pressure and the desire to be popular."

References

External links 
 

2012 films
2010s coming-of-age drama films
Philippine coming-of-age films
Philippine independent films
Philippine drama films
2012 independent films
2012 drama films